Ernest Crichlow (June 19, 1914 – November 10, 2005) was an American social realist artist.

Early life and career
Crichlow was born in Brooklyn, New York, in 1914 to Barbadian immigrants. He studied art at the School of Commercial Illustrating and Advertising Art in New York and New York University. Crichlow started work as an artist in a studio sponsored by Works Progress Administration's Federal Art Project. Augusta Savage was an early patron of his work, as was the case for many of the artists of the Harlem Renaissance.

Career
His first exhibition was in 1938 in the Harlem Community Center in Harlem, New York. One of his best known works, the lithograph Lovers III shows a young black woman being harassed in her bedroom by a member of the Ku Klux Klan. Crichlow's work was exhibited in the 1939 New York World's Fair and in the Library of Congress the following year.

Over the next few decades, his work was regularly shown in leading US art galleries especially in the northeast although he held two exhibitions in Atlanta University in the 1940s. By the end of his career, his work had been honored by President Carter. His 1967 painting White Fence showing a young white girl being separated by a fence from five black girls was the most notable from his later career along with a 25 panel mural at Boys and Girls High School in Brooklyn.

Crichlow was also well known as an illustrator for children's literature providing art work for Two in a Team, Maria, Lift Every Voice and Magic Mirrors.  In 1958, he founded the Brooklyn's Fulton Art Fair.   He founded the Cinque Gallery in 1969 with Norman Lewis and Romare Bearden.  He  taught art at the City College of New York,  the State University of New York at New Paltz,  Shaw University in Raleigh, North Carolina, the Brooklyn Museum Art School and the Art Students League.

A resident of Fort Greene, Brooklyn, Crichlow died of heart failure on November 10, 2005.

References

Article on Ernest Crichlow
"Ernest Crichlow." St. James Guide to Black Artists St. James Press, 1997.
Reproduced in Biography Resource Center. Farmington Hills, Mich.: Thomson Gale. 2005.
Newsday obituary November 12, 2005
Skylight Gallery Archives: Ernest Crichlow

External Links 
Interview with Ernest Crichlow on All Things Considered, NPR

1914 births
2005 deaths
20th-century American painters
American male painters
21st-century American painters
Works Progress Administration workers
People from Fort Greene, Brooklyn
New York University alumni
20th-century African-American painters
21st-century African-American artists
20th-century American male artists